Söke station is a railway station in Söke, Turkey and the southern terminus of the Ortaklar-Söke railway. It is serviced by three daily regional trains to Basmane Terminal in Izmir, Nazilli and Denizli respectively. The station was opened on 1 December 1890 by the Ottoman Railway Company.

References

Railway stations in Aydın Province